The TV Mast Niort-Maisonnay is a  guyed mast for TV transmission in Maisonnay, near Niort, France. Built in 1978, it is one of the tallest structures in France, taller than Eiffel Tower.

See also 
 List of tallest structures in the world

Notes

External links
 http://perso.wanadoo.fr/tvignaud/galerie/tv-fm/79niort.htm
 
 http://www.skyscraperpage.com/diagrams/?b45906

Towers completed in 1978
Buildings and structures in Deux-Sèvres
Radio masts and towers in Europe
Transmitter sites in France
1978 establishments in France